Jane Lucas was an English stage actress and singer of the late seventeenth and early eighteenth century. From around 1693 she was a member of the United Company based at the Theatre Royal, Drury Lane. In 1697 she had fellow actor Colley Cibber arrested, although the reason was not clear and she remained acting in the company alongside him for some years afterwards.

Selected roles
 Lucy Welldon in Oroonoko by Thomas Southerne (1695)
 Amanda's Servant in Love's Last Shift by Colley Cibber 1696)
 Maukine in Pausanius by Richard Norton (1696)
 Sue in The Cornish Comedy by George Powell (1696)
 Lucy in The Perjured Husband by Susanna Centlivre (1700)
 Mademoiselle in The Funeral by Richard Steele (1701)
 Parly in Sir Harry Wildair by George Farquhar (1701)
 Clora in All for the Better by Francis Manning (1702)
 Malapert in Vice Reclaimed by 	Richard Wilkinson (1703)
 Lucy in Tunbridge Walks by Thomas Baker (1703)
 Flora in The Fair Example by Richard Estcourt (1703)
 Lettice in The Lying Lover by Richard Steele (1703)
  Mrs Edging in The Careless Husband by Colley Cibber (1704)
 Mrs ap Shinken in An Act at Oxford by Thomas Baker (1705)
 Jenny in Farewell Folly by Pierre Motteux (1705)
 Alpiew in The Basset Table by Susanna Centlivre (1705)

References

Bibliography
 Highfill, Philip H, Burnim, Kalman A. & Langhans, Edward A. A Biographical Dictionary of Actors, Actresses, Musicians, Dancers, Managers & Other Stage Personnel in London, 1660–1800:Cabanel to Cory. SIU Press, 1973.
 Lowerre, Kathryn. Music and Musicians on the London Stage, 1695–1705. Routledge, 2017.
 Van Lennep, W. The London Stage, 1660–1800: Volume One, 1660–1700. Southern Illinois University Press, 1960.

17th-century English people
18th-century English people
English stage actresses
17th-century English actresses
18th-century English actresses
Year of birth unknown
Year of death unknown